XHLB-FM is a radio station on 104.7 FM in Jamay, Jalisco. It is known as Candela La Barca and affiliated to Cadena RASA.

History
XELB-AM 1090 received its concession on July 27, 1949. It was a 250-watt daytimer until the 1990s, when it upgraded to 5 kW day and 1 kW night.

XELB was authorized for AM-FM migration in 2011.

References

Radio stations in Jalisco